Qassar is an Arabic name and a variant of Cassar and Kassar. Qassar may refer to:

 Qassar Khusayfah, group of islets in Bahrain
 Qassar al Qulay`ah, an island of Bahrain